As Time Goes By: the Great American Songbook, Volume II is Rod Stewart's second album of pop standards, and his 21st album overall. It was released on 14 October 2003 by J Records.

Track listing 

Notes
  signifies an additional producer
 On the European edition, "Where or When" is a duet with Lisa Ekdahl.
 On the Spanish edition, "I Only Have Eyes for You" is a duet with Ana Belén.

Personnel 
 Rod Stewart – lead vocals, whistle (10)
 Rob Mathes – keyboards (1, 3, 5, 9, 12), rhythm arrangements (1, 3, 8, 9, 12, 14), string arrangements and conductor (1), nylon guitar (3), acoustic piano (5)
 Philippe Saisse – keyboards (1, 3, 9, 12), string arrangements (3, 9), synthesizers (8, 14)
 Henry Hey – acoustic piano (1, 8, 9, 12, 14)
 Michael Thompson – acoustic piano (2, 4, 6, 10, 11, 13), string synthesizer (2, 4, 6, 8, 10, 11, 13, 14), rhythm arrangements (2, 4, 6, 8, 10, 11, 13, 14), horn arrangements (4, 11, 13), saxophone and clarinet arrangements (6), woodwind arrangement (11, 13), vibraphone (14)
 Rob Mounsey – keyboards (3, 12), string arrangements (3, 12), string conductor (3, 9, 12)
 Peter Nero – acoustic piano (3)
 David Spinozza – acoustic guitar (1, 3, 9, 12), guitar (5, 8, 14)
 Dean Parks – guitar (2, 4, 6, 10, 11, 13, 14)
 Aaron Kaplan – guitar (4)
 Larry Koonse – guitar (4, 6, 11, 13)
 Carl Sturken – guitar (5, 7), acoustic piano (7)
 Jimmy Rip – guitar (8, 14)
 Frank Simes – guitar (10)
 David Finck – bass (1, 5, 7, 8, 9, 14)
 Reggie McBride – bass (2, 4, 6, 11, 13)
 Tom Barney – bass (3, 12)
 Chris Golden – bass (10)
 Frank Vilardi – drums (1, 9)
 John Ferraro – drums (2, 6)
 Shawn Pelton – drums (3, 8, 12, 14), percussion (5)
 Joe LaBarbera – drums (4, 13)
 Warren Odze – drums (5, 7)
 Jimmy Paxson – drums (10)
 Kendall Kay – drums (11)
 Joe Locke – vibraphone (5)
 Arturo Sandoval – trumpet solo (1, 12)
 Doug Webb – saxophone solo (2, 4, 11), horn (4, 13), alto saxophone (6), clarinet (6), saxophone (11), woodwind (11, 13), clarinet solo (13)
 Dave Koz – alto saxophone (9)
 Lawrence Feldman – clarinet solo (3)
 Richard Perry – rhythm arrangements (2, 4, 6, 8, 10, 11, 13, 14), vocal arrangements (4)
 Alan Broadbent – string arrangements and conductor (4)
 Arnold Stiefel – vocal arrangements (4)
 Colin Freeman – string arrangements and conductor (6)
 Lauren Wild – rhythm arrangements (8, 10)
 Mort Lindsey – string arrangements and conductor (10, 14)
 Elena Barere – concertmaster (1, 3, 9, 12)
 Ann Kim, Richard Locker and Mark Shuman – cello (1, 3, 9, 12)
 Jean LeBlanc and Richard Locke – cello (5) 
 Adria Benjamin, Monica Gerard, Mary Hammann and Vincent Lionti – viola (1, 3, 9, 12)
 Elena Barere, Avril Brown, Cenovia Cummings, Maura Giannini, Ann Leathers, Laura McGinnis, Jan Mullen, Marti Sweet, Ricky Sortomme, Yuri Vodovoz and Carol Webb – violin (1, 3, 9, 12)
 Cher – lead vocals (4)
 Queen Latifah – lead vocals (11)

Production
 Executive Producer – Clive Davis
 Producers – Phil Ramone (Tracks 1, 3, 9 & 12); Richard Perry (Tracks 2, 4, 6, 8, 10, 11, 13 & 14); Carl Struken and Evan Rogers (Tracks 5 & 7).
 Associate Producer on Tracks 2, 4, 6, 8, 10, 11, 13 & 14 – Lauren Wild
 Additional Production on Track 5 – Rob Mathes 
 Production Manager and Music Contractor on Tracks 1, 3, 9 & 12 – Jill Dell'Abate
 Production Coordinator on Tracks 5 & 7 – Andrea Derby
 Additional Production Coordinator on Track 5 – Jill Dell'Abate
 A&R – Steve Fererra
 Recording Engineers – Joel Moss (Tracks 1, 3, 5, 9 & 12); Eric Schilling (Tracks 1, 3, 9 & 12); Frank Filipetti (Tracks 3 & 12); Carter William Humphrey (Tracks 2, 4, 6, 10, 11, & 13); Al Hemberger (Tracks 5 & 7); Ray Bardani (Tracks 8 & 14); J.J. Blair (Track 10).
 Vocal Recording – Bobby Ginsburg (Tracks 4, 11 & 13); Carter William Humphrey (Track 11).
 Additional Engineering – Chris Carroll, Mike Gilnes, Pete Karam, Michael O'Reilly and Steve Orchard (Tracks 1, 3, 9 & 12); Mark Gonzalez, Aaron Kaplan, Pooya Salettyar and Pablo Soloranzo (Tracks 2, 4, 6, 8, 10, 11, 13 & 14); Matt Noble (Tracks 5 & 7).
 Assistant Engineers – Patrick Magee, Tim Olstead and Jay Spears (Tracks 1, 3, 9 & 12); ason Finkle (Track 5); Jason Stasium (Track 5); Roy Matthews (Tracks 5 & 7).
 Pro Tools Operator on Tracks 1, 3, 9 & 12 – Jason Stasium 
 Additional Pro Tools Engineering – Mark Gonzalez, Aaron Kaplan, Pooya Salettyar and Pablo Soloranzo (Tracks 2, 4, 6, 8, 10, 11, 13 & 14); Jan Folkson (Track 5).
 Mixing – Frank Filipetti (Tracks 1, 3, 9 & 12); Bobby Ginsburg (Tracks 2 & 10); Carter William Humphrey (Tracks 2, 4, 6, 8, 11, 13 & 14); Jan Folkson (Track 5); Al Hemberger (Track 7).
 Mix Assistants – Jay Spears (Tracks 1, 3, 9 & 12); Jason Finkle and Jason Stasium (Track 5).
 Mastered by Doug Sax and Robert Hadley at The Mastering Lab (Ojai, CA).
 Technician Assistant on Tracks 2, 4, 6, 8, 10, 11, 13 & 14 – Ben McCarthy
 Creative Director – Alli Truch
 Art Direction and Design – Jeri Heiden
 Photography – Andrew MacPherson
 Project Manager – Lotus Donovan
 Management – Arnold Stiefel for Stiefel Entertainment.

Charts

Weekly charts

Year-end charts

Certifications

References

2003 albums
Albums produced by Clive Davis
Albums produced by Phil Ramone
Albums produced by Richard Perry
Rod Stewart albums
Traditional pop albums
Albums recorded at Capitol Studios
Albums recorded at MSR Studios
Covers albums